Nadia Noujani (Arabic: نادية نوجاني; born 3 September 1981 in Touarga, Rabat-Salé-Kénitra) is a Moroccan long-distance runner. At the 2012 Summer Olympics, she competed in the Women's 5000 metres, but did not finish her race.

Doping 
Noujani tested positive for EPO at a competition in Tanger 26 April 2014, and was subsequently handed a two-year doping ban.

References

1981 births
Living people
Moroccan female long-distance runners
Olympic athletes of Morocco
Athletes (track and field) at the 2012 Summer Olympics
Doping cases in athletics
Moroccan sportspeople in doping cases
People from Rabat-Salé-Kénitra